Diotrephes is a genus of flies in the family Tachinidae.

Species
D. atriventris (Walker, 1853)
D. formosus Reinhard, 1964

References

Exoristinae
Diptera of North America
Tachinidae genera